Quill is the only album by the band of the same name, released in 1970 on the Cotillion Records label.

Track listing 
All songs composed by Jon and Dan Cole, unless otherwise noted.

 "Thumbnail Screwdriver" – 5:22
 "Tube Exuding" – 3:47
 "They Live The Life" – 9:16
 "BBY" – 4:58
 "Yellow Butterfly" – 4:09
 "Too Late" – 3:52 (Norm Rogers)
 "Shrieking Finally" – 7:30

Personnel 
Jon Cole
Dan Cole
Norman Rogers
Roger North
Phil Thayer

References 

1970 debut albums
Cotillion Records albums